Traíra River is a river of Colombia and Brazil. It is part of the Amazon River basin. It is a tributary of the Apaporis River.

The Taraira River or Traíra River is a river forms part of the boundary of Colombia and Brazil.

West bank of the river
On the west bank of the Taraira or Traíra River is located the municipality Taraira (Vaupés), which contains in its area the Taraira Airport and the Taraira Lagoon (is an old meander of the Apaporis River).

See also
List of rivers of Colombia

References

Rand McNally, The New International Atlas, 1993.

Rivers of Colombia
Rivers of Amazonas (Brazilian state)